Hypsoblennius brevipinnis, commonly known as the barnaclebill blenny, is a species of combtooth blenny found on coral reefs in the eastern-central Pacific Ocean.  This species grows to a length of  TL.

References

brevipinnis
Fish described in 1861
Taxa named by Albert Günther